The Australian cricket team toured England in June 2018 to play five One Day International (ODIs) and one Twenty20 International (T20I) matches. Ahead of the ODIs, Australia played List A matches against Sussex and Middlesex.

Australia lost the first two ODI matches and, as a result, slipped to sixth place in the ICC ODI Championship. Australia had lost thirteen of their last fifteen completed ODIs, falling to a 34-year low in the ICC rankings. In the next match, England scored the highest innings total in ODIs, scoring 481 runs for the loss of six wickets and, in the process, won the series with two games to play. England won the ODI series 5–0, the first time that Australia had been whitewashed in a five-match ODI series against England. Twelve wickets taken by Moeen Ali and Adil Rashid each are the most for England spinners in a bilateral ODI series. England also won the one-off T20I match, by 28 runs.

Squads

Ahead of the tour, Josh Hazlewood was ruled out of Australia's ODI squad, and he was replaced by Michael Neser. Ben Stokes was unavailable for the first three ODIs of the series due to injury, with Sam Billings added to England's squad as cover. Stokes joined the squad for the last two ODIs. However, he did not play and continued his rehabilitation from injury. Jake Ball was added to England's squad as cover for Chris Woakes. Woakes was eventually ruled out of the tour with an ongoing knee injury. Sam Curran and Craig Overton were added to England's ODI squad for the last two ODIs.

Tour matches

List A: Sussex vs Australia

List A: Middlesex vs Australia

ODI series

1st ODI

2nd ODI

3rd ODI

4th ODI

5th ODI

T20I series

Only T20I

Notes

References

External links
 Series home at ESPN Cricinfo

2018 in English cricket
2018 in Australian cricket
International cricket competitions in 2018
2018